Sergey Vadimovich Kozyrev (born 18 September 2002) is a Russian freestyle wrestler who competes at 125 kilograms. He broke into the senior level scene in 2021, when he claimed the Russian National Championship, earned silver at the European Continental Championships and qualified to compete at the 2020 Summer Olympics by winning the World Olympic Qualification Tournament. In the age–group, he became the 2018 Youth Olympic champion at 110 kilograms.

Career 

In 2018, Kozyrev claimed the Cadet European Championship, placed third at the Cadet World Championships and most notably claimed the Youth Olympic championship when he defeated Iranian phenom and reigning Cadet World Champion Amir Hossein Zare in the finale.
He made his international senior level debut by placing eleventh at the Golden Grand Prix Ivan Yarygin 2020, and later in the year went on to place tenth at the 2020 Russian National Championships at 97 kilograms. The following year, he burst into the scene by claiming the 2021 Russian National Championship, upsetting two–time National champion and '19 European Games gold medalist from Chechnya Anzor Khizriev in the semifinals and beating Atsamaz Tebloev in the finale. Next, he competed at the 2021 European Championships, where after wins over Oleksandr Khotsianivskyi and Dániel Ligeti, he went on to lose to three–time Olympic and World Champion from Turkey Taha Akgül, who claimed his tenth European Continental Championship, claiming silver.

Kozyrev competed at the 2021 World Olympic Qualification Tournament, and after consecutive wins over '20 Bulgarian National runner–up Georgi Ivanov, '20 Individual World Cup runner–up Robert Baran and two–time European Championship medalist Dániel Ligeti, he was able to cruise to the finals, thus qualifying for the 2020 Summer Olympics. He won his match against '18 Commonwealth Games gold medalist from India Sumit Malik by walkover on May 7. Malik then tested positive for doping and was disqualified.

On 5 August, Kozyrev competed as an independent athlete due to Russia's ban from the Olympic Games, on the first date of the men's freestyle 125 kg event of the 2020 Summer Olympics. In the first match, he was downed by two-time World medalist Deng Zhiwei from China, who lost his next match, being eliminated from the Games and placing eleventh.

Major results

Freestyle record 

! colspan="7"| Senior Freestyle Matches
|-
!  Res.
!  Record
!  Opponent
!  Score
!  Date
!  Event
!  Location
|-
|Win
|15–5
|align=left| Mönkhtöriin Lkhagvagerel
|style="font-size:88%"|9–3 Fall
|style="font-size:88%"|December 3, 2021
|style="font-size:88%"|2021 Alrosa Cup
|style="text-align:left;font-size:88%;"| Moscow, Russia
|-
! style=background:white colspan=7 |
|-
|Loss
|14–5
|align=left| Deng Zhiwei
|style="font-size:88%"|1–4
|style="font-size:88%"|August 5, 2021
|style="font-size:88%"|2020 Summer Olympics
|style="text-align:left;font-size:88%;"| Tokyo, Japan
|-
! style=background:white colspan=7 | 
|-
|Win
|14–4
|align=left| Sumit Malik 
|style="font-size:88%"|WO
|style="font-size:88%" rowspan=4|May 6–7, 2021
|style="font-size:88%" rowspan=4|2021 World Olympic Qualification Tournament
|style="text-align:left;font-size:88%;" rowspan=4|
 Sofia, Bulgaria
|-
|Win
|13–4
|align=left| Dániel Ligeti 
|style="font-size:88%"|3–2
|-
|Win
|12–4
|align=left| Robert Baran
|style="font-size:88%"|7–1
|-
|Win
|11–4
|align=left| Georgi Ivanov
|style="font-size:88%"|TF 12–2 
|-
! style=background:white colspan=7 |
|-
|Loss
|10–4
|align=left| Taha Akgül
|style="font-size:88%"|DQ (2–9)
|style="font-size:88%" rowspan=3|April 20–21, 2021
|style="font-size:88%" rowspan=3|2021 European Continental Championships
|style="text-align:left;font-size:88%;" rowspan=3|
 Warsaw, Poland
|-
|Win
|10–3
|align=left| Dániel Ligeti
|style="font-size:88%"|TF 10–0
|-
|Win
|9–3
|align=left| Oleksandr Khotsianivskyi
|style="font-size:88%"|9–7
|-
! style=background:white colspan=7 |
|-
|Win
|8–3
|align=left| Azamat Tebloev
|style="font-size:88%"|3–3
|style="font-size:88%" rowspan=5|March 11–14, 2021
|style="font-size:88%" rowspan=5|2021 Russian National Championships
|style="text-align:left;font-size:88%;" rowspan=5|
 Ulan-Ude, Russia
|-
|Win
|7–3
|align=left| Zelimkhan Khizriev
|style="font-size:88%"|5–1
|-
|Win
|6–3
|align=left| Anzor Khizriev
|style="font-size:88%"|2–2
|-
|Win
|5–3
|align=left| Khasan Khubaev
|style="font-size:88%"|8–5
|-
|Win
|4–3
|align=left| Erik Dzhioev
|style="font-size:88%"|2–1
|-
! style=background:white colspan=7 |
|-
|Loss
|3–3
|align=left| Rasul Magomedov
|style="font-size:88%"|3–5
|style="font-size:88%" |October 16–18, 2020
|style="font-size:88%" |2020 Russian National Championships
|style="text-align:left;font-size:88%;" |
 Naro-Fominsk, Russia
|-
! style=background:white colspan=7 |
|-
|Loss
|3–2
|align=left| Said Gamidov
|style="font-size:88%"|6–13
|style="font-size:88%" |January 23–26, 2020
|style="font-size:88%" |Golden Grand Prix Ivan Yarygin 2020
|style="text-align:left;font-size:88%;" |
 Krasnoyarsk, Russia
|-
! style=background:white colspan=7 |
|-
|Loss
|3–1
|align=left| Magomedkhan Magomedov
|style="font-size:88%"|5–10
|style="font-size:88%" rowspan=5|September 27–28, 2019
|style="font-size:88%" rowspan=5|2019 U23 All–Russian Yuri Gusov Memorial
|style="text-align:left;font-size:88%;" rowspan=5|
 Vladikavkaz, Russia
|-
|Win
|3–0
|align=left| David Dzugaev
|style="font-size:88%"|7–5
|-
|Win
|2–0
|align=left| Askhab Boltukaev
|style="font-size:88%"|TF 10–0
|-
|Win
|1–0
|align=left| Magomed Tagirov
|style="font-size:88%"|TF 12–1
|-

References

External links 
 

Living people
2002 births
Place of birth missing (living people)
Russian male sport wrestlers
Wrestlers at the 2018 Summer Youth Olympics
Youth Olympic gold medalists for Russia
European Wrestling Championships medalists
Wrestlers at the 2020 Summer Olympics
Olympic wrestlers of Russia
21st-century Russian people